Mexicana Universal 2020 was the 3rd edition of the Mexicana Universal beauty pageant held on November 29, 2020. 30 candidates from all over Mexico competed for the national title. Claudia Lozano of Nuevo León crowned Andrea Meza of Chihuahua at the end event. Meza represented Mexico at the Miss Universe 2020 pageant which she won to become the third Mexican Miss Universe.

Results

Mexicana Universal 2020

Color keys
  The contestant won in an International pageant.
  The contestant was a Finalist/Runner-up in an International pageant.
  The contestant was a Semi-Finalist in an International pageant.
  The contestant did not place.

Contestants

Charms Award 
Some candidates throughout the concentration were winning different challenges, obtaining a badge according to their performance:

Simbología

Crossovers 

Contestants who previously competed or will be competing in other national beauty pageants or in international beauty pageants.

 Miss Universe

 Miss World

 Miss Earth
2017:  Karen Bustos (as )

 Miss Teen USA
2013:   Ciudad de México Brenda Smith (as ''; Top°16)

 Nuestra Belleza Latina
2018:  Andrea Bazarte (Top°15)
2018:  Brenda Smith (Top°15)

 Miss Tourism International
2018:  Patricia Morato (Top°10)

 Nuestra Belleza México
2017:  Estefanía Ruiz 
2016:  Ana Lucila Linaje

Miss México
2016:   Andrea Meza (Winner)
2016:  Patricia Morato (Top°16)

Mexicana Universal Jalisco
2018:  Michel Sosa (1st Runner-up)

Mexicana Universal Sinaloa
2018:  Deborah Hallal (2nd Runner-up)

Mexicana Universal Tabasco
2017:  Thania de la Fuente (2nd Runner-up)

 Miss Teen Mundial
2016:  Débora Hallal (Top°10)

 Teen Universe México
2016:  Ivanna Díaz (Top°16)

 Reina de la Feria Nacional de San Marcos
2018:  Pamela Barrera (Winner)

 Miss Tourism Worldwide 
2019:  Grecia Victoria Soto

 Señorita México 
2018:  Monserrat Sánchez Flores (Winner)

Notes

Withdrawals
 
  Estado de México

Returns

Last competed in 2018:

References

External links
Official Website

2020 beauty pageants
Beauty pageants in Mexico
Mexicana Universal
2020 in Mexico